The Most Known Unknown is a DVD recorded by The Acacia Strain on December 28, 2008, in Worcester, Massachusetts at The Palladium. The band shared the stage with The Red Chord, Whitechapel, Shipwreck AD, Cruel Hand, and Thy Will Be Done.

Disc 1 – Live At The Palladium
 "Whoa! Shut It Down!"
 "See You Next Tuesday"
 "3750"
 "4x4"
 "Skynet"
 "Brown Noise"
 "As If Set Afire"
 "Dr. Doom"
 "Baby Buster"
 "Cthulhu"
 "Burnface"
 "The Combine"
 "Angry Mob Justice"
 "The Behemoth (Intermission)"
 "Demolishor"
 "Balboa Towers"
 "Passing The Pencil Test"
 "Forget-Me-Now"
 "Sun Poison And Skin Cancer"
 "JFC"
 "Carbomb"

Disc 2 – Live At The Waterfront + Extras
 "Whoa! Shut It Down!"
 "See You Next Tuesday"
 "3750"
 "4x4"
 "Brown Noise"
 "Angry Mob Justice"
 "As If Set Afire"
 "Dr. Doom"
 "Burnface"
 "Sun Poison And Skin Cancer"
 "Carbomb"

The Acacia Strain: A Retrospective
Ten Seconds of Fame (The Golden Ticket Holders)
Music Videos: Skynet, Angry Mob Justice, Smoke Ya Later

References

External links
The Acacia Strain official website

2010 video albums
The Acacia Strain albums
Live video albums
2010 live albums